Anwar Hossen (known as  Ali Raz; born 15 March 1957) is a Bangladeshi film actor who has appeared in nearly 400 films in Dhallywood. He won Bangladesh National Film Award for Best Supporting Actor twice for his roles in the films Pure Jay Mon  (2016) and Jannat (2018).

Career
In 1970s, Raj got his first break in BTV drama Bhangoner Shobdo Shuni. In 1977, he shifted from his home Sirajganj to Dhaka. In 1984, Razzaq made the film Shotbhai in which he played the half brother of Razzaq. Then, he became a leading actor and starred in hundreds of films in 1980s and 1990s. In 2010s, he returned to Dhallywood and switched to playing supporting roles.

Works

References

External links

Living people
1957 births
People from Sirajganj District
Bangladeshi male television actors
Bangladeshi male film actors
Best Supporting Actor National Film Award (Bangladesh) winners